Orthosiphon aristatus, commonly known as cat's whiskers or Java tea, is a plant species in the family Lamiaceae (also known Labiatae). The plant is a medicinal herb found mainly throughout southern China, the Indian Subcontinent, South East Asia, and tropical Queensland, Australia. As a medical herb, it is used for increasing excretion of urine, lowering uric acid, protecting kidney, reducing oxidative stress, reducing inflammation, protecting liver, protecting stomach, lowering blood pressure, ameliorating diabetes, ameliorating hyperlipidemia, fighting microorganisms and fighting anorexia.

Orthosiphon aristatus is used in landscaping to attract bees, butterflies and hummingbirds to its nectar.

Varieties
 Orthosiphon aristatus var. aristatus  - most of species range
 Orthosiphon aristatus var. velteri Suddee & A.J.Paton - Vietnam

References

External links
 Taxonomy browser (Orthosiphon aristatus)
 Orthosiphon aristatus information from NPGS/GRIN

aristatus
Medicinal plants
Plants described in 1826
Flora of Asia
Flora of Queensland